Ewald Riebschläger (24 October 1904 – 29 October 1993) was a German diver who won two gold, one silver and two bronze medals at the European championships of 1927–1934. He competed at the 1928 Summer Olympics in the 10 m platform and 3 m springboard events and finished in fifth and sixth place, respectively.

References

1904 births
1993 deaths
German male divers
Olympic divers of Germany
Divers at the 1928 Summer Olympics
People from Zeitz
Sportspeople from Saxony-Anhalt
20th-century German people